The 1901–02 Copa Macaya was the 2nd staging of the Copa Macaya. This tournament is best known for being the very first trophy won by the Spanish club FC Barcelona. The competition was held on the road between 22 December 1901 and ended on 12 March 1902.

Overview
The previous edition of the competition had been won by Hispania AC, after beating Barcelona to the title by just two points. In the decisive game, Barcelona managed to score a winner against Hispania that would have forced a playoff for the title, but the goal was disallowed by the referee due to a supposed offside, a decision heavily protested by the Barça players, in vain. So in this second tournament, Barça was driven to claim the trophy and get some revenge along the way, and the first step they took was to sign Hispania's captain and best player at the tournament, Gustavo Green.

The second edition was contested by 5 teams: FC Barcelona, Hispania AC, Club Espanyol (now RCD Espanyol), Català SC and Universitary SC.

The pre-favorites to win the competition were the Barça team because at that time they had great international figures such as captain Joan Gamper, Arthur Witty and of course, Gustavo Green, plus a new signing Udo Steinberg, who also ended up being decisive. In the second edition of the Macaya Cup, the scenario of the previous season was repeated, with a clear superiority of Hispania and Barcelona over the rest, meaning that the title was decided in the direct confrontations between them once again. On 6 January 1902, in the first round, Barcelona beat Hispania 2–4, and when they met again in the penultimate matchday, Barça won again 1–0 thanks to a lonely goal from Steinberg, a victory that mathematically, secured them the title. In the eight games played in the tournament, Barça only conceded two goals, in the 2–4 win over Hispania, and scored a resounding 60 goals, 15 of which came on the final matchday in a 15–0 victory over Català SC, which was held at Velódromo de la Bonanova on 23 March 1902, with Steinberg netting 6 goals, and Gamper and Leask clutching a hat-trick each, thus sealing the club's first-ever piece of silverware in style.

Table

Results
The list below only includes the matches played by Barcelona due to lack of information about the remaining games.

Statistics

Top Scorers

See also
Catalan football championship
1902 Copa de la Coronación
1901–02 FC Barcelona season

References

External links
Federació Catalana de Futbol 

Copa Catalunya seasons
1901–02 in Spanish football
Defunct international club association football competitions in Europe